Love Story is an early American anthology series which was broadcast on the DuMont Television Network in 1954.

This show should not be confused with NBCs dramatic anthology series Love Story which aired during the 1973–1974 television season.

Broadcast history
The series, an anthology, ran from April to June of 1954. DuMont's Love Story is not to be confused with another dramatic anthology with the same name which ran on NBC in the 1970s, or a game show also titled Love Story which aired on CBS from 1955–1956.

Love Story aired live on Tuesday nights at 9 pm EST on most DuMont affiliates. The series was produced by David Lowe.

Criticism
This series was hampered by a small budget and starred mostly lesser-known actors. Latter-day critics, such as Castleman and Podrazik (1982), have cited Love Story, among other DuMont series, as one of the reasons fewer and fewer viewers tuned in to the ailing DuMont Network. They called the series "a simpering romance anthology" that, like several other DuMont programs during the 1953–1954 season was "doomed from the start by third-rate scripts and cheap production." The series did not last long, and the network itself began crumbling shortly thereafter.

See also
List of programs broadcast by the DuMont Television Network
List of surviving DuMont Television Network broadcasts

References

Bibliography
David Weinstein, The Forgotten Network: DuMont and the Birth of American Television (Philadelphia: Temple University Press, 2004) 
Alex McNeil, Total Television, Fourth edition (New York: Penguin Books, 1980) 
Tim Brooks and Earle Marsh, The Complete Directory to Prime Time Network TV Shows, Third edition (New York: Ballantine Books, 1964)

External links

DuMont historical website
Love Story at CVTA with episode list

1954 American television series debuts
1954 American television series endings
1950s American anthology television series
Black-and-white American television shows
DuMont Television Network original programming
English-language television shows
American live television series